Vladimir "Vlatko" Konjevod (1923– 4 December 2005) was a Yugoslav and later Bosnian professional football manager and player.

Playing career

Club
He played for SAŠK, Osijek, Željezničar, Sarajevo, Travnik, Slaven Živinice and Napredak Modriča.

Managerial career
Konjevod player-managed Travnik, Slaven Živinice and Modriča, after which he fully managed Čelik Zenica, Željezničar, Dinamo Zagreb, Beringen and Olimpija Ljubljana.

He won the 1948–49 Yugoslav Second League with Sarajevo as a player, while as a manager, Konjevod guided Željezničar to win the 1961–62 Yugoslav Second League (West Division) and Dinamo Zagreb to a 1964–65 Yugoslav Cup triumph.

Honours

Player
Sarajevo
Yugoslav Second League: 1948–49

Manager
Željezničar
Yugoslav Second League: 1961–62 (West)

Dinamo Zagreb
Yugoslav Cup: 1964–65

References

External links

1923 births
2005 deaths
Footballers from Sarajevo
Association football forwards
Yugoslav footballers
Bosnia and Herzegovina footballers
NK SAŠK Napredak players
NK Osijek players
FK Željezničar Sarajevo players
FK Sarajevo players
NK Travnik players
FK Modriča players
Yugoslav Second League players
Yugoslav First League players
Yugoslav football managers
NK Travnik managers
NK Čelik Zenica managers
FK Željezničar Sarajevo managers
GNK Dinamo Zagreb managers
K. Beringen F.C. managers
NK Olimpija Ljubljana (1945–2005) managers
Yugoslav First League managers
Yugoslav expatriate football managers
Expatriate football managers in Belgium
Yugoslav expatriate sportspeople in Belgium